Gravdalsvatnet is a lake in the western part of Bergen Municipality in Vestland county, Norway.  The  lake is located immediately south of the village of Gravdal in the borough of Laksevåg, west of the center of the city of Bergen. National Road 555 runs along the south shore, just east of the mountain Lyderhorn.

References

Lakes of Vestland
Geography of Bergen